Fort Washington is a census-designated place in Fresno County, California. The 2010 United States census reported Fort Washington's population was 233.

Demographics

At the 2010 census Fort Washington had a population of 233. The racial makeup of Fort Washington was 209 (89.7%) White, 4 (1.7%) African American, 1 (0.4%) Native American, 7 (3.0%) Asian, 0 (0.0%) Pacific Islander, 1 (0.4%) from other races, and 11 (4.7%) from two or more races. Hispanic or Latino of any race were 26 people (11.2%).

The whole population lived in households, no one lived in non-institutionalized group quarters and no one was institutionalized.

There were 97 households, 18 (18.6%) had children under the age of 18 living in them, 73 (75.3%) were opposite-sex married couples living together, 3 (3.1%) had a female householder with no husband present, 5 (5.2%) had a male householder with no wife present.  There were 1 (1.0%) unmarried opposite-sex partnerships, and 0 (0%) same-sex married couples or partnerships. 15 households (15.5%) were one person and 10 (10.3%) had someone living alone who was 65 or older. The average household size was 2.40.  There were 81 families (83.5% of households); the average family size was 2.67.

The age distribution was 33 people (14.2%) under the age of 18, 14 people (6.0%) aged 18 to 24, 25 people (10.7%) aged 25 to 44, 75 people (32.2%) aged 45 to 64, and 86 people (36.9%) who were 65 or older.  The median age was 57.8 years. For every 100 females, there were 104.4 males.  For every 100 females age 18 and over, there were 106.2 males.

There were 101 housing units at an average density of ,of which 97 were occupied, 88 (90.7%) by the owners and 9 (9.3%) by renters.  The homeowner vacancy rate was 0%; the rental vacancy rate was 0%.  213 people (91.4% of the population) lived in owner-occupied housing units and 20 people (8.6%) lived in rental housing units.

References

Census-designated places in Fresno County, California
Census-designated places in California